The 2017 NCAA Men's Water Polo Championship occurred from November 25, 2017, to December 3rd in Los Angeles at the Uytengsu Aquatics Center. This was the 49th NCAA Men's Water Polo Championship. Eight teams across from all divisions participated in this championship.

Schedule

Qualification

The six-member selection committee selects eight institutions based on a wide number of factors, primarily number of wins, rigor of schedule, level of availability, an indication of an upward trend or winning consistently, and RPI.

Seeding

Likewise with the criteria mentioned above, seeding was based on level of ranking, geographic proximity to the finals site, and a projected low level of academic commitments missed. The pots outlined feature what level in the championship institutions competed in, ranging from competing away in the first round for Pot 4 to skipping to the semifinals in Pot 1.

Bracket

The championship featured a knockout format where schools that lost were eliminated from the tournament.

Harvard's play-in win over George Washington was the first-ever victory for a school outside California in a non-consolation game in tournament history. (As of 2019, however, California schools still maintain a perfect record against teams outside the state.)

Honors

The following distinctions were distributed concluding the championship to athletes that had superior performance of some kind in the championship.

All-tournament Teams

First Team

Second Team

Tournament scoring leader

Team rankings

References

2017 in American sports
2017 in water polo
2017 in sports in California
NCAA Men's Water Polo Championship